Thirumittacode inscription (c. 1028 AD) is an early 11th century Chola inscription from Thirumittacode, near Pattambi (opposite to the Palghat Gap, on south bank of Bharathappuzha), in central Kerala. The old Malayalam inscription in Vattezhuthu script (with some Grantha characters) is engraved on the obverse side of a single granite block in the door frame of the Thirumittacode temple. The inscription is one of the rare Chola records found in Kerala proper.

 The inscription, dated in the 8th regnal year of Chera Perumal king Ravi Goda (fl. 11th century AD), relates to the rule of Chola emperor Rajendra (r. 1012–1044 AD) in Kerala.
 It records the gift of gold equal to forty "pazhankashu" to the Thirumittacode temple by "Chola Mutharaiyan" named Chekkizhan Shakthinjayan from Kavanur, Melur Kottam in Thondai Nadu, who was carrying out the royal orders of emperor Rajendra Chola. 
 The record mention the old Malayalam name of the temple as "Thiruvitruvacode". It also notes the so-called "Agreement of Muzhikkulam".

References 

Kerala history inscriptions
Chola dynasty